Viola pedunculata, the California golden violet, Johnny jump up, or yellow pansy, is a perennial yellow wildflower of the coast and coastal ranges in California and northwestern Baja California.   The common name "Johnny jump up" is usually associated with Viola tricolor however, the introduced garden annual.

It prefers part shade, but will tolerate sun in many locations.

Description
Viola pedunculata  is a perennial, growing from a spongy rhizome.

The leaves are 1-5.5 cm long, cordate (heart-shaped) to deltate-ovate (oblong-triangular), scalloped or toothed, and glabrous or hairy. They are summer deciduous.

The fragrant flowers appear in March and April, and are a rich, saturated yellow to yellow-orange, with brown-purple nectar guides on the lower petals. The flowers are hermaphrodite, and are pollinated by native and introduced insects.  Dried in air, the seeds weigh about  each.

Subspecies
Viola pedunculata ssp. pedunculata   
Viola pedunculata ssp. tenuifolia

Uses

Culinary
The leaves were used by the Diegueno and Luiseno indigenous people of California for food:. The young leaves were picked before the flowers appeared in the spring, then boiled, and used as greens.

The flower buds and petals are edible. As with other yellow flowers in the genus Viola, large quantities may cause diarrhea.An herbal tea or tisane can be brewed from the leaves.

Cultivation
The plant is cultivated as an ornamental plant by specialty plant nurseries, for planting as a drought tolerant seasonal groundcover or flowering accent plant in native plant and wildlife gardens; and as a potted plant.

They are propagated by seed or nursery/garden divisions. The plant prefers rich soil, and no irrigation water in summer, when it is dormant.

When cultivated in colder climates outside its native range where not so hardy, it is most successful when propagated in a cold frame.

References

External links

CalFlora Database: Viola pedunculata (California golden violet)
 Jepson Manual treatment for Viola pedunculata
Species entry in Plants for a Future

pedunculata
Flora of California
Flora of Baja California
Natural history of the California chaparral and woodlands
Natural history of the California Coast Ranges
Natural history of the Channel Islands of California
Natural history of the Peninsular Ranges
Natural history of the San Francisco Bay Area
Natural history of the Santa Monica Mountains
Natural history of the Transverse Ranges
Indigenous peoples of California topics
Plants used in Native American cuisine
Garden plants of North America
Flora without expected TNC conservation status